The Regional Institute of Science & Technology (RIST) was established in 2009 by the Erd Foundation (a charitable trust). It is a technical college in the north eastern region of India. The college and courses are recognized by the All India Council for Technical Education (AICTE) and affiliated to The North Eastern Hill University, Shillong, Meghalaya. The Regional Institute of Science & Technology was set up to cater to the needs for technical manpower in the north eastern region of the country.

The college offers four year undergraduate courses in six disciplines, viz. Computer Science & Engineering, Electronics and Communication Engineering, Information Technology, Electrical & Electronics Engineering, Mechanical Engineering and Civil Engineering.

Location
The institute is located on the hills of 9th Mile, opposite the CRPF group centre, Khanapara, Ri-Bhoi district of Meghalaya.

Branches
The college offers BTech courses in:
     Computer Science & Engineering
     Electrical & Electronics Engineering
     Electronics & Communication Engineering
     Information Technology
     Mechanical Engineering
     Civil Engineering
The courses are affiliated to North-Eastern Hill University.

Intake
The following are the intake for each branch:
 Computer Science & Engineering 120
 Electrical & Electronics Engineering 60
 Electronics & Communication Engineering 60
 Information Technology 60
 Mechanical Engineering 60
 Civil Engineering 120

Admission
Candidates with valid AIEEE score can apply directly. Candidates not having AIEEE score can appear for the Common Entrance Test conducted by the ERD Foundation. All the north eastern states has reserved seats for which candidates are selected by the Director of Technical Education of the state.

Facilities
 Computerized library 
 Residential accommodation in separate hostels for boys and girls.
 Fleet of buses for transport.
 Dedicated leased line internet connectivity 
 More than 100 desktop terminals in a network with a server farm.
 Other facilities includes gym, fitness studio, health care, IT centre, cafes and restaurants.

See also
 University of Science and Technology Meghalaya

References

External links
 RIST Official Website
 ERDF Official Website
 USTM Official Website

Universities and colleges in Meghalaya